tenKsolar  designs, manufactures and markets an integrated photovoltaic system that leverages integrated electronics and a low-voltage, parallel architecture.   Compared to conventional solar systems, the architecture provides 45% better energy density, higher reliability, and is the only PV system that is both shock and arch flash safe.

History 

Early in 2008, Dallas Meyer began developing the intellectual property for the company's proprietary technology. Later that year, the company was capitalized with $8 million in investments.

In 2009, tenKsolar formed a strategic partnership with Minneapolis-based thin-film manufacturer 3M, which supplies tenKsolar with reflective film to boost light concentration onto the solar panels. This helped the company's RAIS (Redundant Array of Integrated Solar) Wave produce up to 50 percent more energy per square foot than a standard solar array.

In September 2010, tenKsolar shipped its first panels and generated about $3 million in revenue. Throughout the year, the company raised about $5.64 million in investments and launched a Series B round of solar panels to boost its sales. Its primary shareholders include PrairieGold Venture Partners and the National Rural Telecommunications Cooperative.

In April 2012, Hanwha Corp (008800) and ESP Novusmodus LP, a fund backed by Irish state utility Electricity Supply Board, led a $15.5 million Series B investment in tenKsolar.

On July 8, 2013, tenKsolar announced a strategic alliance with Gehrlicher North America to deploy high-efficiency RAIS into solar PV projects in the North American market.

In May 2017, tenKsolar announced it was suspending operations.

Technology 

tenKsolar manufactures the RAIS WAVE system which combines PV modules, power electronics, static reflection, and racking configured in a repeating wave pattern to provide the market's most energy dense PV system for flat roof deployments.  The cells, modules, and inverters are all wired in parallel, and the module and system voltage is 50 V.  The low voltage, parallel architecture contributes to a highly reliable system architecture that has no single point of failure and a system that is inherently safe, with no possibility of generating arc flashes or lethal shocks.  This architecture, combined with module integrated power electronics, enables  tenKsolar's modules to utilize static/non uniform reflection and therefore generate 20% more energy per installed Watt of power when combined with tenK's integrated reflector.  The integrated electronics also enable the system to automatically sense ground faults and shut down immediately.  The ultimate result of tenKs technology is a system that is extremely energy dense, reliable, and safe.

TenK vs. Traditional Solar
Traditional solar systems generally include independently developed modules, racking, and inverters.  The cells and modules are wired in a series of strings, thereby building up voltage to 300 V to 1000 V strings of modules.  The module strings are connected to centralized or string inverters that operate at 200 V to 1000 V.

Performance:
Traditional systems, because of their serial architecture, can suffer significant performance issues due to individual cell issues, module issues, or even light shading.   One cell failure within a module will bring down the performance of that whole module.  A module performance issue or outright failure will in turn bring down the performance of the whole string of modules.  In a traditional serial system, the performance of the system depends on its worst performing component, and that will have a material cascading impact to the overall system.   In tenK's system, a cell issue will impact only that cell, and a module performance issue will impact only that module.  The performance issue is isolated, and has an immaterial impact to the overall system.  Likewise, shading has an impact only on the shaded component, and does not impact the rest of the system.

Safety:
Conventional systems can generate both life-threatening shocks and arc flashes.  Both installers and firefighters must take strict precautions when working with PV systems.  UL has indicated that PV systems can cause death to firefighters if not treated properly.  In September 2013, a 250,000-square-foot warehouse burned down due to the firefighters’ inability to properly fight a fire due to concerns about the safety of a conventional system.   Due to tenK's inherent low voltage, and its internal ground fault detection, there is no risk of life-threatening shocks of fire causing flash arcs.  The system is marketed as 100% safe.

In May 2011, tenKsolar released its third-generation 180 W RAIS® photovoltaic module, which is built with high efficiency mono-crystalline solar cells configured in a proprietary cell matrix configuration. The system reportedly generates up to 60% more energy per roof.

In August 2012, tenKsolar announced a 420 W poly-crystalline or the 440 W mono-crystalline PV module. It is a larger module that is tilted at 22 degrees.

Termination of Business 

In May 2017, Ten K Solar announced it was terminating most of its business activities. Widespread failure of inverters was blamed for flagging sales and rising warranty/ repair claims.

References

External links 
 tenKsolar Company website

American companies established in 2008
Manufacturing companies based in Minneapolis
Photovoltaics manufacturers
Solar energy companies of the United States
American brands
Manufacturing companies established in 2008
2008 establishments in Minnesota
Energy companies established in 2008